The A531 is non-primary route in England that runs from Madeley Heath in Staffordshire to join the A500 close to Weston near Crewe, Cheshire.

Roads in England
Roads in Cheshire